Southwest Riders is a compilation presented by American rappers E-40 and B-Legit. It was released August 26, 1997 on Jive and Sick Wid It Records. The album features production by Bosko, DJ Paul, Juicy J, KLC, The Legendary Traxster, Sam Bostic, Studio Ton and T-Mix. It peaked at number 2 on the Billboard Top R&B/Hip-Hop Albums and at number 23 on the Billboard 200. The album features performances by Richie Rich, UGK, A-1, WC, 3X Krazy, Luniz, Celly Cel, Eightball & MJG, Twista and Brotha Lynch Hung.

A music video was produced for the song, "Yay Deep", featuring E-40, B-Legit and Richie Rich.

The song, "Represent" was also released as a music video to promote the compilation and later appeared on A-1's debut album, Mash Confusion. The video features cameo appearances by E-40, B-Legit, Celly Cel and Suga-T.

The song, "N.S.R.", was also released on The Mossie's 1997 debut album, Have Heart Have Money.

Critical reception 

Allmusic – "Southwest Riders is a fine collection of bass-driven Southern hip-hop. The individual artists aren't important -- the deep, rumbling bass grooves are, and they keep rolling throughout the entire collection, making it a worthwhile acquisition for bass-heads."

Rap Pages – "...a 28-song rainbow of gangsterism lifestyles..."

RapReviews – "...over 54 rappers combining for a near perfect double album. A few weaker tracks prevent this compilation from being flawless...Even 11 years later this compilation is still worth the price of admission. Perhaps mere coincidence or possibly a testament to the...scouting talent, you'll find that the bulk of the contributors are still dropping albums and still relevant in the game."

The Source – "...a fitting introduction to some of the lesser known hustlers on the grind....Southwest Riders is a double album that is sure to satisfy long-time reality rap fiends..."

Track listing

Disc one

Disc two

Chart history

References

External links 
 [ Southwest Riders] at Allmusic
Southwest Riders at Discogs
Southwest Riders (Disc 1) at MusicBrainz
Southwest Riders (Disc 2) at MusicBrainz
Southwest Riders at Tower Records

B-Legit albums
1997 compilation albums
E-40 albums
Gangsta rap compilation albums
Jive Records compilation albums
Sick Wid It Records compilation albums
Albums produced by The Legendary Traxster
Albums produced by Studio Ton
Albums produced by Bosko